Mary Louisa "Mollie" Martin (3 September 1865 – 24 October 1941) was a tennis player from Ireland. She was considered the leading Irish female player of her time.

Martin started playing tennis in 1885 and early on was successful at the tournaments in Bath and Buxton.  In 1898 she entered the Wimbledon Championships for the first time and, after two wins and two byes, reached the All-comers' final, but was beaten in two sets by Charlotte Cooper. She did not play Wimbledon in 1899, and the following year, she again reached the All-comer's final to face Cooper and again lost. Her third and final entry at Wimbledon in 1901 also ended with a loss in the All-comers' final against Cooper.

Martin won nine singles titles at the Irish Lawn Tennis Championships between 1889 and 1903 and was a runner-up three times. She won six singles titles at the Northern Championships, which was held alternately in Liverpool and Manchester.

With Sydney H. Smith, she won two mixed doubles titles at Wimbledon.

She was a member of the Fitzwilliam Lawn Tennis Club in Dublin, which staged the Irish Championships.

Grand Slam finals

Singles (1 runner-up)

Notes

References

1865 births
1941 deaths
Irish female tennis players
British female tennis players